Raymond Schouten (born 15 March 1985) is a Dutch motorcycle racer. He won the Dutch Superstock 600 Championship in 2007 and the Dutch Supersport Championship in 2010.

Schouten has also competed in the Dutch ONK 125cc Championship (where he was the runner-up in 2002), the Dutch ONK 250cc Championship, the Superstock 1000 FIM Cup, the Dutch ONK Superbike Championship – where he was the runner-up in 2009 and 2011 – and the Endurance World Cup.

Career statistics

Grand Prix motorcycle racing

By season

Races by year
(key)

References

External links
 Profile on MotoGP.com
 Profile on WorldSBK.com

1985 births
Living people
Dutch motorcycle racers
125cc World Championship riders
250cc World Championship riders
FIM Superstock 1000 Cup riders
People from Waardhuizen
Sportspeople from North Brabant
21st-century Dutch people